César Humberto Chávez-Riva Gálvez (born 22 November 1964) is a Peruvian football manager and former player who played as a goalkeeper. He is the current assistant manager of Binacional.

Career
Born in Lima, Chávez Riva played the majority of his career for Universitario. Chávez Riva made 12 appearances for the Peru national football team from 1986 to 1989. He participated in the 1987 and 1989 Copa Américas.

References

External links

1964 births
Living people
Footballers from Lima
Association football goalkeepers
Peruvian footballers
Peru international footballers
1987 Copa América players
1989 Copa América players
Peruvian Primera División players
Club Universitario de Deportes footballers
Sport Boys footballers
Ciclista Lima Association footballers
Peruvian football managers
Universidad San Martín managers
Deportivo Binacional FC managers